Mercer Davies (10 December 1924 – 26 January 1997) was a South African long-distance runner. He competed in the marathon at the 1956 Summer Olympics.

References

1924 births
1997 deaths
Athletes (track and field) at the 1956 Summer Olympics
South African male long-distance runners
South African male marathon runners
Olympic athletes of South Africa
Sportspeople from East London, Eastern Cape